Tony is a 2013 philosophical thriller Kannada film directed by Jayatheertha. The film stars Srinagar Kitty and Aindrita Ray in lead roles. Indrakumar GV is producing this film jointly with Srinagar Kitty which is backed with Sadhu Kokila's music and Gnanamurthy's cinematography.

Shot extensively around the scenic locales of Bangkok and other places, the film speaks about a person who wants to make quick money and has three dimensional stories interwoven and ends up at a common point. One of the sub plot of the movie was based on the 1886 short story How Much Land Does a Man Need? by Leo Tolstoy.

Cast
 Srinagar Kitty as Keshava alias Tony
 Dilip Raj
 Aindrita Ray
 Sharath Lohitashwa
 Preeti Jhangiani
 Swayamwara Chandru
 Suchendra Prasad as Ashok
 Veena Sundar
 Harish Rayappa

Production

Development
Director Jayatheertha, who made a successful previous film titled, Olave Mandara, announced his next feature film and titled it as Tony, a name which was already used in the Ambareesh - Lakshmi starrer in the 1981s.

Promotion
Tony was widely promoted all across the Karnataka State. The film team also promoted in one of the most popular television shows, Bigg Boss hosted by actor Sudeep. The film is extensively shot in Bangalore, Mysore, Bangkok among other places. The film was also made news for spending big bucks for songs. Singer Raghu Dixit who crooned for a number in the film, performed at the sets. Sudeep also enthralled the audiences by singing a song.

Soundtrack
The music for the film was composed by Sadhu Kokila, with lyrics penned by Yogaraj Bhat, Jayanth Kaikini, Arasu Anthare and Jayatheertha.

Track list

Release

Critical reception 
A critic from The Times of India wrote that "With three different narration tracks, the movie gets difficult to understand at times. It is a movie not for the mass or class but for the thinking class".

References

External links

2013 films
2010s Kannada-language films
Films shot in Bangkok
2013 romantic drama films
Indian romantic drama films
Films shot in Bangalore
Films shot in Mysore
Films directed by Jayatheertha